Yerevan Brusov State University of Languages and Social Sciences, is a public university in Yerevan, the capital of Armenia, operating since 1935. It is named after the Russian poet and historian Valery Bryusov since 1962.

The university graduates are specialists in Russian, English, French, German and many other languages, practical psychology, history, political science, area studies and other humanities. The university is located on the intersection of Tumanyan and Moscow streets at the centre of Yerevan.

History

Yerevan Brusov State University of Languages and Social Sciences is the successor of the Russian Language Teachers' Institute founded as a 2-year intermediate college on February 4, 1935, by the decision of the Central Committee of the Communist Party of Armenia.

The German language section was opened in 1936, followed by the French and English languages sections in 1937, when the institute produced its first teachers of the Russian language. In 1940, the institute became known as the Yerevan State Russian Language Teachers' Institute. In 1955, the institute was given the status of a faculty within the Yerevan State University, simultaneously preserving its structural and academic independence. However, it was granted independence in 1962 and became known as the Yerevan State Pedagogical University of Russian and Foreign Languages named after Valery Brusov. In 1985, the Soviet government awarded the Order of Friendship of Nations to the university.

After the independence of Armenia, in 1993 the university was restructured and renamed Yerevan State Institute of Foreign Languages named after Valery Brusov.

In 2001, in compliance with the government resolution, the institute was granted the status of university and renamed as Yerevan Brusov State Linguistic University. In 2014, the university was restructured to become known as the Yerevan Brusov State University of Languages and Social Sciences.

Throughout its history, the university has produced more than 18,000 graduates of Russian, English, French, German, Greek, Spanish languages, practical psychology, history, political science and area studies. The process of structural changes is still continuing and in the near future they will provide an opportunity to train professionals who meet the new demands of the republic.

In 2013, the university staff consisted of 477 members, including the instructing staff of 434 members, 189 members are on full-time position, 48 of them hold more than one office, 12 Doctors of Science, 14 Professors, 102 Candidates of Science, and 54 Assistant Professors.

Faculties
As of 2017, the university had 3 faculties as well as the faculty of studies.

Faculty of Translation and Intercultural Communication
The Faculty of Translation and Intercultural Communication was founded in 2004, and restructured in 2013 to provide a double-profiled education and bachelor programs in the following fields:
Linguistics and Communication
English and Area Studies
English and Political Science
English and Journalism
English and Tourism
English and Psychology
German and Area Studies
French and Area Studies
Translation Studies/Linguistics
English-Armenian Translation Studies
German-Armenian Translation Studies
French-Armenian Translation Studies

Faculty of Russian and Foreign Languages and International Communications
The faculty's origins date back to the foundation of the university in 1935. However, the most recent development of the faculty took place in 2013 when it was restructured to provide bachelor programs in:
Linguistics, Russian language
Russian Literature
Philology
Pedagogy
Linguistics and Intercultural Communication
Russian and Area Studies
English and Political Sciences
Political Sciences

A second foreign language is taught in accordance with the students' choice, including English, Polish, Bulgarian, German, French, Spanish, Italian and Arabic.

Faculty of Foreign Languages
The faculty was founded in 2004 and currently provides bachelor programs in the fields of:
Pedagogy
English and French
English and German
English and Spanish
English and Italian
English and Persian
English and Greek
English and Korean
French and English
German and English
Linguistics
English and French
English and German
English and Spanish
English and Italian
English and Persian
English and Greek
English and Korean
English and Hindi
French and English
German and English
Italian and English

Master's program
In 2008-09 academic year, the university launched a two-degree system, including bachelor's and master's degrees. The study for Masters at the Brusov University presumes the choice of specific aspect of specialty with the aim of getting thorough practical and theoretical knowledge.

Outstanding Armenian and foreign specialists are included in the process of study. Master's level studies offer the following specialties:

Linguistics
Degree: MA in Linguistics
Programs offered:
 Comparative Typology of Languages,
 Comparative Linguistics
 Semiotics
Qualification: Linguist (Typology, Semiotics)

Pedagogy
Degree: MA in Pedagogy
Programs offered:
 Multilingual Education
 Pedagogical Psychology
Qualification: Multilingual teacher (English-French, English-German, French-English, German-English, Russian- English), School Psychologist

Philology
Degree: MA in Philology
Programs offered: English, French, German, Russian Philology
Qualification: Philologist

Linguistics and Intercultural Communication
Degree: MA in Linguistics and Intercultural Communication
Programs offered:
 European Studies
 International Relations
 Political Science
 International Tourism
 Cultural Anthropology
 Semiotics of Culture

Translation/Interpretation
Degree: MA in Philology
Programs offered:
 English - Armenian
 French - Armenian
 German - Armenian
 Russian - English – Armenian
Qualification: Translator/ Interpreter (English–Armenian, French-Armenian, German-Armenian, Russian-English-Armenian)

International Journalism
Degree: MA in International Journalism
Programs offered: International Journalism
Qualification: Journalist

Education Management
Degree: MA in Education Management
Programs offered: Education Management
Qualification: Education Manager

Postgraduate Programs
The postgraduate diploma system of the university makes a distinction between scientific degrees. There are two successive postgraduate degrees: Candidate of Science (PhD) and Doctor of Science. Postgraduate program was introduced in 1963 and since then it has had over 300 graduates. At present, the programs enroll one doctor’s degree candidate, sixteen full-time students; forty-eight postgraduate students take correspondence courses.

As of 2013, 14 qualification exam committees are functioning at the university:
 Foreign Language Teaching Methodology
 Germanic Languages (English, German)
 Romance Languages (French)
 Slavonic Languages
 Foreign Literature
 Russian Literature
 General and Applied Linguistics
 Comparative and Applied Linguistics
 Armenian Language
 Philosophy
 Practical skills in English
 Practical skills in French
 Practical skills in German
 Computer skills

Doctor's Degree Awarding Board is functioning in the university. Authorized by Higher Qualification Committee of Armenia, the Board awards degrees of Candidates of Science, Doctor of Science in the following fields:
 Comparative and Typological Linguistics, Philology
 Slavonic Languages, Philology
 Methodology of Education and Teaching (Foreign Languages and Literature)

Research and publications
The main tendencies and the content of the scientific research work carried out by the University chairs are conditioned by the structural peculiarities and the scientific potential of the University. The main tendencies of the University activities are:
 Linguistic policy
 Romance and Germanic philology
 Textbooks and manuals for schools and higher educational institutions
 Theory of translation, applied problems of theory of translation, translation practice
 Compiling dictionaries
 General linguistics, general problems of applied linguistics, comparative typology (in the fields of grammar, lexicology, stylistics and syntax of the text)
 Theoretical and practical problems of the Armenian language
 Problems of Armenian Literature and History of Art
 Problems of the Modern and Contemporary History of the Armenian people
 Economic and political problems of the transforming society
 History of philosophical thought
 History of religion
 Theory and Practice of Pedagogics and Methods of Teaching Languages
 Area Studies of the language major
 Social Psychology, Psychology of personality and development, clinical psychology, sexology
 European and American Literature, Literature Studies
 Theory of culture
 Problems of emergency situations

International relations

Membership and collaborations
 Language Policy Division (Council of Europe, Strasbourg),
 European Centre for Modern Languages (Council of Europe, Graz, Austria),
 UNESCO International Association of Universities,
 Association of Francophone Universities (AUF),
 Black Sea Universities Network
 European Language Council (ELC, Germany)
 CIS Member states Council for Languages and Culture
 CIS Member states Association of Linguistic Universities
 International Association of Teachers of the Russian Language and Literature.

Joint projects
 International Research and Exchanges Board in Armenia (IREX)
 Open Society Institute Assistance Foundation Armenia (OSIAFA)
 TEMPUS Joint European Project
 Eurasia Partnership Foundation
 Korea Foundation
 DAAD (German Academic Exchange service)
 KOICA (Korea Institutional Cooperation Agency)
 Confucius Institute Headquarters

Cooperation agreements
 Minsk State Linguistic University, Belarus
 Sofia University St. Kliment Ohridski, Bulgaria
 Shanxi University, China
 Dalian University of Foreign Languages, China
 Tallinn University, Estonia
 G. Tsereteli Institute of Oriental Studies, Georgia
 Tbilisi Ilia Chavchavadze State University, Georgia
 Siegen University, Germany
 The Martin Luther University of Halle-Wittenberg, Germany
 Ferdowsi University - Mashhad, Iran
 University of Perugia, Italy
 University of Verona, Italy
 Association Rondine Cittadella della Pace, Italy
 Catholic University of Leuven, Belgium
 Seoul National University, South Korea
 Ajou University, South Korea
 Hankuk University of Foreign Studies, South Korea
 Korea University, South Korea
 Vytautas Magnus University, Lithuania
 Moldova State University, Moldova 
 Free International University of Moldova, Moldova 
 Ovidius University of Constanta, Romania
 Moscow State University, Russian
 Moscow State Linguistic University, Russian
 Moscow State University of Humanities, Russian
 Pyatigorsk State Linguistic University, Russian
 Ryazan State University after S. Yesenin, Russian
 State Institute of the Russian Language after A. Pushkin, Russian
 Tatar State University of Humanities and Education, Russian
 Pereyaslav-Khmelnitsky State Pedagogical University, Ukraine

The European Year of Languages, 2001 was a joint initiative of the Council of Europe and European Commission to promote multilingualism and a greater languages capability across Europe. The Yerevan State University of Languages and Social Sciences was selected as basic events host for organizing the European Year of Languages, 2001.

Since then, the celebration of the European Day of Languages on September 26 has become a tradition in Armenia.
Since 1998, in cooperation with the Council of Europe the University has been initiating annual international conferences on Language Policy and Linguistic Education.

Workshops organized by European Centre for Modern Languages based in Graz, are regularly held at the university to implement the general and special projects and programs, and to help Foreign Language Teaching professionals link their classroom activities to the Common European Framework of Reference for Languages.

Library
The University Library was founded in 1935. At present the Library holds more than 400,000 books on Social and Political science, education, academic articles and works of fiction in Armenian, Russian, English, French, Spanish, German, Persian, and other languages, including collection of unique books.
The library resources are regularly updated. In addition to the main library, there are specialized libraries at Chairs.
The new building of the central library has a reading hall, a research hall, a repository, and a computer cluster with Internet and access to open library network through the New ICT system.

The fund of fiction is the richest part containing the best publications of the Armenian, European and Russian classics of the 19th-20th centuries. The literature on linguistics as well as educational literature in English, French, Spanish, German, Czech, Romanian, Bulgarian and Persian is richly presented in the fund. It also encompasses the Library of the World Children Literature, 200 volumes of World Literature, "Britannica", "World Book", "People and Places" ¨ "Great Books of the Western World" encyclopedias, explanatory dictionaries, dictionaries, thesaurus, guides and manuals. For the recent decade the fund was replenished with the addition of new books presented by the accredited Embassies in Armenia as well as donations received from private libraries.

The fund of unique and rare books -amounting to 2000 units- is the special value of the library. The pearls of human thought and the typological art of the 1st-20th centuries represent it.

Student life
The university students exercise self-governance through the student council, founded in 1996. The council aims to actively participate in the university life and assist in promoting discussion and resolution of urgent issues in the academic process, and in social life of the students.

The council actively cooperates with the Student Councils of different Universities in Armenia and abroad. The council organizes graduation ceremonies, publication of the "Polyglot-New" newspaper; round table discussions, intellectual games, conferences, workshops and seminars, etc. The students work as volunteers in various organizations and closely cooperate with the university's career centre. The students regularly visit different orphanages in Yerevan and regions, organize different sport, scientific and cultural events.

Career and alumni centre
The Yerevan Brusov University career centre was founded on November 3, 2007. The main objectives of the centre are to improve students and graduates competitiveness in labour market, to establish university-graduate relations, to develop the cooperation between them, to solve the set up problems.

The two main target-groups of the venture are students and graduates. To reach the set up goals the Centre plans to cooperate with the following groups:
Academic-pedagogical staff
Different in-University substructures
Private and state organizations, employers and entrepreneurs
International organizations, NGOs, and other organizations and individuals that are interested in cooperation process

See also
:Category:Yerevan Brusov State University of Languages and Social Sciences alumni

References

External links
 Yerevan State Linguistic University after V. Brusov official site
Yerevan State Linguistic University After V. Brusov: YSLU | ArmeniaGoGo

Universities and institutes established in the Soviet Union
 
Academic language institutions
Educational institutions established in 1935
1935 establishments in Armenia
Universities in Armenia
Education in Yerevan